The Advertiser Shield, also known as the Junior Union Football Championship, was an annual Australian rules football competition in South Australia held between representative teams from the metropolitan leagues that were members of the SA Junior National Football Union from 1932. The Shield was named after and sponsored by The Advertiser.

Advertiser Shield results

Competing leagues and associations
The following is a list of known competitors in the Advertiser Shield:

References

Australian rules football competitions in South Australia
1932 establishments in Australia